Charlie Spiller (born October 18, 1983) is a former American football wide receiver. He was signed by the Tampa Bay Buccaneers as a street free agent in 2008. He played college football at Alcorn State.

External links
Official website
Tampa Bay Buccaneers bio

Further reading

1983 births
Living people
People from Woodville, Mississippi
American football wide receivers
Alcorn State Braves football players
Tampa Bay Buccaneers players